Brady Charles Williams (born October 18, 1979) is an American professional baseball coach who is the third base coach for the Tampa Bay Rays of Major League Baseball (MLB).

Life and career
Born in Salt Lake City, Utah, he is the son of Jimy Williams, a former Major League infielder, coach and manager. Brady Williams, an infielder himself, was selected by the Boston Red Sox in the 45th round of the 1999 Major League Baseball draft out of Pasco-Hernando Community College. That season, his father was in the process of managing the Red Sox to a wild card berth in the 1999 American League pennant race. Brady Williams appeared in 264 minor league and 316 independent league games over the course of a seven-year (1999–2005) professional career, batting .233 with 441 hits and 58 home runs. He reached the Double-A level for eight games in 2002 as a member of the New Britain Rock Cats.

In 2006, Williams became a coach in the Tampa Bay Devil Rays organization at the Class A level, and has been a manager with the Short Season-A Hudson Valley Renegades (2009), Class A Bowling Green Hot Rods (2010–12), and Class A Charlotte Stone Crabs (2013). He was named the Midwest League's top managerial prospect of 2012 by Baseball America, and through  had compiled a win–loss record of 695–627 (.526). From 2014–2018, he spent five years as skipper of the Montgomery Biscuits, the Rays' Double-A affiliate. In his second year in Montgomery, Williams led his club to the second-half North Division championship and the Southern League playoffs. On January 18, 2019, Williams was named the manager of the Durham Bulls.

On November 14, 2022, Williams was officially announced as the Rays' new third base coach, replacing Rodney Linares.

Brady Williams' younger brother Shawn is a minor league manager and former player; he has been a skipper in the Philadelphia Phillies' farm system since 2014.

References

External links

1979 births
Living people
Augusta GreenJackets players
Bakersfield Blaze players
Berkshire Black Bears players
Bridgeport Bluefish players
Durham Bulls managers
Fort Myers Miracle players
Gulf Coast Red Sox players
New Britain Rock Cats players
Pennsylvania Road Warriors players
Sarasota Red Sox players